Hidalgo County is the southernmost county of the U.S. state of New Mexico. As of the 2010 census, the population was 4,894. The county seat and largest city is Lordsburg. A bill creating Hidalgo from the southern part of Grant County was passed on February 25, 1919, taking effect at the beginning of 1920. The county was named for the town north of Mexico City where the Treaty of Guadalupe Hidalgo was signed, which in turn was named for Miguel Hidalgo y Costilla, the priest who is known as the "Father of Mexican Independence." The county is located on the Mexico–United States border.

Geography
The southern part of the county, the part bounded on the east and south by Mexico, is known as the Bootheel.

Adjacent counties and municipios
 Grant County – north
 Luna County – east
 Cochise County, Arizona – west
 Greenlee County, Arizona – northwest
 Agua Prieta, Sonora, Mexico – south
 Ascensión, Chihuahua, Mexico – southeast
 Janos, Chihuahua, Mexico – south

National protected areas
 Coronado National Forest (part)
 Gila National Forest (part)

Demographics

2000 census
As of the 2000 census, there were 5,932 people in the county, organized into 2,152 households, and 1,542 families. The population density was 1 person per square mile (1/km2). There were 2,848 housing units at an average density of 1 per square mile (0/km2). The racial makeup of the county was 42% White and about 55% of the population was Hispanic.

Size of family households: 592 2-persons, 341 3-persons, 316 4-persons, 165 5-persons, 83 6-persons, 48 7-or-more-persons. The average household size was 2.7 and the average family size was 3.29. In non-family households, there were 684 with 314 male householders (286 living alone), 293 female householders (262 living alone), and 77 non-relatives. In group quarters, there were 85 (all institutionalized).

In the county, the population was spread out, with 31.70% under the age of 18, 7.80% from 18 to 24, 25.20% from 25 to 44, 21.70% from 45 to 64, and 13.60% who were 65 years of age or older. The median age was 35 years. For every 100 females there were 99.60 males. For every 100 females age 18 and over, there were 97.00 males.

The median income for a household in the county was $31,286. The per capita income for the county was $12,431. 27.8% of the population was below the poverty line. Out of the total population, 38.90% of those under the age of 18 and 17.00% of those 65 and older were living below the poverty line. Unemployment rate in April 2010 was 7.6%.

2010 census
As of the 2010 census, there were 4,894 people, 1,936 households, and 1,286 families residing in the county. The racial makeup of the county was 85.3% white, 0.8% American Indian, 0.6% black or African American, 0.5% Asian, 11.0% from other races, and 1.8% from two or more races. Those of Hispanic or Latino origin made up 56.6% of the population. The largest ancestry groups were:

 50.3% Mexican
 15.2% German
 10.0% English
 6.0% Irish
 4.4% Dutch
 3.6% American
 2.1% Scottish
 2.0% Italian
 1.7% Swedish
 1.4% Norwegian
 1.0% Polish

Of the 1,936 households, 33.4% had children under the age of 18 living with them, 46.4% were married couples living together, 14.2% had a female householder with no husband present, 33.6% were non-families, and 29.1% of all households were made up of individuals. The average household size was 2.49 and the average family size was 3.09. The median age was 40.9 years.

The median income for a household in the county was $36,733 and the median income for a family was $41,594. Males had a median income of $43,531 versus $23,482 for females. The per capita income for the county was $17,451. About 20.6% of families and 22.6% of the population were below the poverty line, including 32.3% of those under age 18 and 15.0% of those age 65 or over.

Communities

City
 Lordsburg (county seat)

Village
 Virden

Census-designated places
 Animas
 Cotton City
 Glen Acres
 Playas
 Rodeo
 Windmill

Unincorporated communities
 Antelope Wells
 Mouser Place
 Road Forks
 Summit

Ghost towns
 Bramlett
 Cloverdale
 Gary
 Road Fork
 Steins
 Shakespeare
 Valedon

Politics
Hidalgo has historically been a swing county, going for the winner every time since 1928, except for 1968 and 2020, where it went for Hubert Humphrey and Donald Trump respectively.

See also
 National Register of Historic Places listings in Hidalgo County, New Mexico
 Janos Biosphere Reserve

References

External links
 Geology of Lordsburg Quadrangle, Hidalgo County
 Animas, Cotton City, and Playas
 Hidalgo county, New Mexico
 Hidalgo county, New Mexico

 
1920 establishments in New Mexico
Populated places established in 1920